The discography of the Belgian band Hooverphonic includes eleven studio albums, two live albums, one EP, three compilation albums and many singles.

Albums

Studio albums

Live albums

Compilation albums

Extended plays

Singles

As lead artist

As featured artist

Miscellaneous contributions

Tributes

Soundtracks

Notes

References

Discographies of Belgian artists
Rock music group discographies